"One More Mountain to Climb" is the 14th Diamond Records single for Ronnie Dove.

Background
Released in 1967, this single peaked at #45 on the Billboard Pop Singles chart. It was his first single since 1964’s Hello Pretty Girl to miss the Billboard Top 40 chart. 

The single's B-side , "All", was originally issued on Dove's 1965 album One Kiss for Old Times' Sake.  

According to an episode of Nashville Now, Glen Campbell played on this song.

Chart positions

References

1967 singles
Ronnie Dove songs